are Japanese kabuki or  plays that feature historical plots and characters, often famous samurai battles. Film and television productions in this mode are called , and share many of the same features.

Overview
Even though many of the viewers may have been samurai, the Edo period in which these plays were largely composed and performed was a period of peace, and so the notion of fierce battles and heroic sacrifices represented something of a romanticised escape in fiction.

Stories were almost always derived from classic epics or other historical sources, often with elements changed, such as the invention of characters to make the story more interesting or to otherwise serve the author's purposes. 

Though most of these stories derive originally from historical fact, the sources used by the playwrights were more legend than accurate narratives, and fantastic or magical elements were further added by the playwrights. One  play, revolves around actual historical figures of the Genpei War, including  and his retainer . However, the historically false conceit that certain  clan generals survived and remain in hiding is central to the plot.

Though  almost always take place in the distant past, they often were intended to make reference to contemporary events. For much of the Edo period, the depiction of contemporary events, in particular, depictions of the s and criticism of the Tokugawa shogunate, were strictly banned. As a result, plays were designed to use historical or literary references as metaphors for current events. The famous play , also known as the tale of the forty-seven , is one example; though the actual forty-seven  and the events surrounding their attempts at revenge for their lord took place in the early 18th century, only a few decades before the play debuted, it was depicted onstage as taking place in the 14th century, with the names of all the principal figures involved being changed.

Terminology
, "vertical plot" / , "horizontal plot"
, a subgenre of living history plays meant to be accurate, not romanticised

References
Kabuki21.com
Jidaimono at KabukiJiten (Japanese)

Kabuki
Bunraku